The Taylorsville Utah Temple is a temple of the Church of Jesus Christ of Latter-day Saints under construction in Taylorsville, Utah. Plans to construct a temple in the city were announced on October 5, 2019 by church president Russell M. Nelson, during the Saturday Women's Session of General Conference. The temple will be the first in the city of Taylorsville, the fifth in Salt Lake County and the 23rd in the state of Utah.

History
On December 11, 2019, it was announced that the temple would be constructed on the site of an existing meetinghouse and recreational field at 2603 West 4700 South. On August 13, 2020, the church announced that the groundbreaking for the temple would be held in October of that year. Gerrit W. Gong of the church's Quorum of the Twelve Apostles presided at the ceremony. The planned three-story, 70,460-square-foot temple will be constructed on the 7.5-acre site. It is anticipated that the temple will be finished in 2023.

See also

 The Church of Jesus Christ of Latter-day Saints in Utah
 Comparison of temples of The Church of Jesus Christ of Latter-day Saints
 List of temples of The Church of Jesus Christ of Latter-day Saints
 List of temples of The Church of Jesus Christ of Latter-day Saints by geographic region
 Temple architecture (Latter-day Saints)

References

External links
 Taylorsville Utah Temple Official site
 Taylorsville Utah Temple at ChurchofJesusChristTemples.org

Temples (LDS Church) in Utah
Taylorsville, Utah